Only God Knows is a 2006 Mexican-Brazilian drama film directed by Carlos Bolado. It stars Alice Braga as Dolores, a Brazilian woman, who meets Dámian (Diego Luna), a Mexican who helps her to reach Mexico City after her passport is stolen.

Co-produced between Brazil and Mexico after an agreement undersigned in Venezuela, it is the first film produced jointly by the two countries. Filming took place in 2004 in Tijuana, Mexico City, Salvador, São Paulo, and San Diego. Post-production was done in São Paulo in 2005 and sound effects were produced in Skywalker Sound.

Its world premiere occurred on January 21 at the 2006 Sundance Film Festival, where it competed in the category Cinema Dramatic of the World Cinema section. It also entered the official selection of the Guadalajara International Film Festival and the Festival de Cine Iberoamericano de Huelva.

Plot
Dolores is a Brazilian working in the USA who goes on a night out with friends across the border in Mexico where her passport gets stolen and found by a Mexican freelance journalist Damian. He helps her get to Mexico city as she believes she needs to reach the Embassy to get new papers to leave the country. The two fall in love during the journey, however the discovery that Damian had her passport all along puts them at odds. Dolores goes back to Brazil as her grandmother has suddenly passed. Dolores discovers she is pregnant despite her thinking she is unable to conceive. Damian follows her to Brazil. When it seems that they may have found each other and have a chance at happiness, fate has other plans.

Cast
Alice Braga as Dolores
Isabella Sass as young Dolores
Diego Luna as Damián
Mariana Muniz as Dolores' grandmother
José María Yazpik as Jonathan
Cecilia Suárez as Olivia
Renata Zhaneta as Renata
Damián Alcázar as Presagio
Leigh Crow as Mrs Bailey

See also

 List of media set in San Diego

References

External links

2006 drama films
2006 films
Brazilian drama films
Films directed by Carlos Bolado
Films set in Mexico City
Films set in San Diego
Films shot in San Diego
Films set in São Paulo
Films shot in São Paulo
Mexican drama films
2000s Portuguese-language films
2000s Spanish-language films
2006 multilingual films
Mexican multilingual films
Brazilian multilingual films
2000s English-language films
2000s Mexican films